The 2005 NACAC Cross Country Championships took place on March 6, 2005.  The races were held at the United States Triathlon National Training Center in Clermont, Florida, United States.  A detailed report of the event was given.

Complete results were published.

Medallists

Medal table (unofficial)

Note: Totals include both individual and team medals, with medals in the team competition counting as one medal.

Participation
According to an unofficial count, 80 athletes from 13 countries participated.

 (1)
 (1)
 (2)
 (3)
 (1)
 (18)
/ (5)
 México (4)
 (1)
 (18)
 (1)
 (2)
 (23)

See also
 2005 in athletics (track and field)

References

NACAC Cross Country Championships
NACAC Cross Country Championships
NACAC Cross Country Championships
NACAC Cross Country
International track and field competitions hosted by the United States
Cross country running in the United States
Cross country running in Florida